Stendal is an unincorporated community in southern Lockhart Township, Pike County, Indiana, United States. It lies along State Road 257, southeast of the city of Petersburg, the county seat of Pike County. Its elevation is 610 feet (186 m), and it is located at  (38.2667177, -87.1444478). Although Stendal is unincorporated, it has a post office, with the ZIP code of 47585.

History
Stendal was laid out in 1867, and named after Stendal, in Germany. A post office has been in operation at Stendal since 1873.

Stendal High School and the Stendal Aces
In 1912, Lockhart Township built a frame building in Stendal to function as a new school. In addition to housing a grade school the building also served as a new high school, registered that same year. However, the high school was not certified until 1923. In addition to the student base of Lockhart Township, the Stendal High School provided students from surrounding townships with an opportunity for a high school education. It had neither a gymnasium nor an assembly room. In early years, basketball and the Junior and Senior class plays were the only extra-curricular activities offered.

In the midst to the great depression in 1932, the principal of Stendal High School was the highest paid among the six high school principals in Pike County, despite the depression era times.

The athletic teams of Stendal High were known as the 'Aces.'  Despite the fact that Stendal did not have a gymnasium, the "Gym-less Wonders" won 3 Pike County Tournaments (1927–28, 1928–29 and 1929–30) behind the star power of Indiana Basketball Hall of Famer, Kern McGlothlin.  The Aces also won three IHSAA Sectional titles (1930–31, 1931–32 and 1938–39) in Boys' Basketball; they advanced to the Finals of the 1938-39 Vincennes Regional before losing to long-time power Vincennes Lincoln.

McGlothlin would return to Stendal as the head coach of the Aces, following a collegiate career at Evansville College.  McGlothlin would accumulate a record of 319-134; including positions at Cynthiana, Ind., Greencastle, Ind., Cannelton, Ind., and Winslow,  Ind.
Much of his IHSAA success came at Winslow, coaching fellow Hall of Famer, Dick Farley.

Stendal High closed in 1966. The last person to graduate was Carolyn McFarland, née Bone, Class of '66 valedictorian.

Notable people
Stendal is the hometown of former U.S. Senator Vance Hartke, who starred for the Stendal Aces basketball team in high school.

References

Unincorporated communities in Pike County, Indiana
Unincorporated communities in Indiana
Jasper, Indiana micropolitan area